Hathara Varan is a 2021 Sri Lankan Sinhala comedy film directed by Chathura Perera in his directorial debut and produced by Sumana Deepthi Gunaratne for Hiru Fashions. It stars director himself in lead role with Pubudu Chathuranga, Kumara Thirimadura and Bandula Wijeweera in supportive roles.

The film has its premiere on 29 January 2021 at the Liberty Cinema in Kollupitiya.

Cast
 Chathura Perera as A.B.C Jinadasa aka Jina
 Pubudu Chathuranga as Police officer
 Kumara Thirimadura as Edward
 Bandula Wijeweera as Hamu mahaththaya
 Teddy Vidyalankara as Edward's henchman 
 Thakshila Sewwandi as Sanjana
 Rajitha Hiran as Jine's accomplice
 Nandana Hettiarachchi as Poli Mudalali
 D. B. Gangodathenna as Sanjana's manager
 Samadara Ariyawansa as Piyawathi, Jine's mother
 Dilki Mihiraji as Madhuri, Jine's sister
 Preethi Wijesinghe as Menika, Sanjana's servant
 Anil Jayasinghe as Sootiya
 Ravindra Pradeep
 Asanga Perera as Electric meter reader
 Pawara Hansana as child actor

References

2020s Sinhala-language films
2021 films
2021 comedy films
Sri Lankan comedy films